Monte Carlo Nights is a 1934 American pre-Code film directed by William Nigh.

Plot
A man wrongfully convicted of murder escapes custody and goes in search of real killer. The problem is that he only has one clue to go on.

Cast
Mary Brian as Mary Vernon
John Darrow as Larry Sturgis
Yola d'Avril as Madelon
Astrid Allwyn as Blondie Roberts
George "Gabby" Hayes as Inspector Nick Gunby
Kate Campbell as Aunt Emma
Robert Frazer as Jim Daggett
Carl Stockdale as Brandon
George Cleveland as Croupier

External links

1934 films
American mystery films
1930s romance films
1934 adventure films
American black-and-white films
Films directed by William Nigh
Monogram Pictures films
1930s mystery films
American romance films
American adventure films
1930s English-language films
1930s American films